The 1961–62 season was Aberdeen's 49th season in the top flight of Scottish football and their 51st season overall. Aberdeen competed in the Scottish League Division One, Scottish League Cup, and the Scottish Cup

Results

Division 1

Final standings

Scottish League Cup

Group 2

Group 2 final table

Scottish Cup

Anglo-Franco-Scottish Friendship Cup

References

AFC Heritage Trust

Aberdeen F.C. seasons
Aber